María Baxa (born Marija Baksa, ; 15 April 1946 – 14 November 2019) was an Italian-Serbian film actress, mainly active in Italian cinema.

Born in Osijek, Baxa made her film debut in Branko Čelović's Bokseri idu u raj, then moved to Italy where she became a popular starlet in Italian genre cinema,  especially in commedia sexy all'italiana (sex comedies). In the late 1980s, Baxa left showbusiness to be an architect.

Filmography

References

External links 
 

1946 births
2019 deaths
Serbian film actresses
Italian film actresses
People from Osijek
Yugoslav expatriates in Italy

Serbs of Croatia 
Italian people of Serbian descent